2004 Dakar Rally also known as the 2004 Paris-Dakar Rally was the 26th running of the Dakar Rally event. The rally started in the Auvergne region of France, passing through Morocco, Mauritania and Mali, and finishing Dakar in Senegal. This was the last time the rally ever visited France. The rally was won by the French team of Stéphane Peterhansel and Jean-Paul Cottret in a Mitsubishi; while the motorcycle class was won by Nani Roma of Spain on a KTM and the trucks class was won by Russians Vladimir Chagin, Semen Yakubov and Sergey Savostin in a Kamaz.

Entries

Bikes

Cars

Trucks

Stages

Notes:
 — The event for trucks was cancelled due to hazardous conditions.

Summary
The competitors included former world rally champion Colin McRae. Stephane Peterhansel took an early lead after the third stage. Four times winner of the rally, Ari Vatanen, won the fourth stage, which was his 50th individual stage win at the Dakar Rally. Peterhansel received a five minutes penalty after his team-mate pushed his car when it encountered gearbox trouble 300m from the finishing line of the fifth stage but retained his overall lead. McRae moved up to third place after the sixth stage but lost time on the seventh stage after getting stuck in a sand dune. Peterhansel retook the lead from overnight leader Hiroshi Masuoka after the eighth stage, and retained it after stage nine. Stages 10 and 11 were cancelled owing to concerns over the security situation in Mali. The rally resumed with stage 12 between Bobo-Dioulasso in Burkina Faso and Bamako in Mali; Peterhansel retained the lead at the end of the stage. McRae won the 13th stage between Bamako and Ayoun el Atrous in Mauritania, the first Briton to win a stage of the Dakar rally since Andrew Cowan in 1990. The 14th, 15th and 16th stages were won by Luc Alphand, Hiroshi Masuoka and Jutta Kleinschmidt. McRae won the final stage but the overall winner was Stephane Peterhansel, who became only the second man to have won both the car and motorcycle categories of the Dakar Rally. The motorcycle category was won by Spaniard Nani Roma.

Stage results

Bikes

Cars

Note:
 — Peterhansel was awarded a five-minute penalty for receiving illegal outside assistance. This only affected the overall classification, with Peterhansel retaining his stage win.

Trucks

  - As the stage was cancelled, all competitors were awarded a stage time of 34:21.

Final standings

Motorcycles

Cars

Trucks

References

Dakar Rally
Dakar Rally
Dakar Rally
Dakar Rally